Østsinni Church is a parish church of the Church of Norway in Nordre Land Municipality in Innlandet county, Norway. It is located in the village of Dokka. It is one of the churches for the Østsinni parish which is part of the Hadeland og Land prosti (deanery) in the Diocese of Hamar. The white, wooden church was built in a long church design in 1877 using plans drawn up by the architect Jacob Wilhelm Nordan. The church seats about 350 people.

History

The first church built at Dokka was a wooden cruciform church that was built and consecrated in 1726. Not much is recorded about that church. In 1877, the old church was torn down and a new wooden long church was built on the same site. The new church was designed by Jacob Wilhelm Nordan.

See also
List of churches in Hamar

References

Nordre Land
Churches in Innlandet
Long churches in Norway
Wooden churches in Norway
19th-century Church of Norway church buildings
Churches completed in 1877
18th-century establishments in Norway